Lakelands is a neo-traditional neighborhood located in Gaithersburg, Maryland. It is located adjacent to and was designed as an extension of Kentlands, another neo-traditional neighborhood.

References

See also
 Kentlands, Gaithersburg, Maryland
 Lakelands Park 
 Lakelands Park Middle School
 Gaithersburg, Maryland

New Urbanism communities